Happiness is a 1998 American black comedy-drama film written and directed by Todd Solondz, that portrays the lives of three sisters, their families, and those around them. The film was awarded the FIPRESCI Prize at the 1998 Cannes Film Festival for "its bold tracking of controversial contemporary themes, richly-layered subtext, and remarkable fluidity of visual style," and the cast received the National Board of Review award for best ensemble performance.

The film spawned the pseudosequel Life During Wartime, which premiered at the 2009 Venice Film Festival.

Plot
Trish Maplewood, the eldest Jordan sister, is a housewife who lives an upper middle class life. She is married to psychiatrist Bill Maplewood and has three children. Trish is unaware of Bill's secret life: he is a pedophile who is obsessed with 11-year-old Johnny Grasso, a classmate of their son, Billy. When Johnny comes to the Jordan house for a sleepover, Bill drugs and rapes him. Later, Bill learns that another boy, Ronald Farber, is home alone while his parents are away in Europe. Under the guise of attending a PTA meeting, Bill drives to the boy's house and rapes him, as well. After Johnny is taken to the hospital and found to have been sexually abused, the police arrive at the Maplewood residence to question Bill and his wife. Bill, out of guilt, mistakenly asks the officers if this is about Ronald Farber, even though the police only mentioned Johnny's name when they arrived, inadvertently implicating himself in an as-yet unknown crime. The next morning the family awakens to the words "serial rapist" and "pervert" spray painted on their house. After school, Billy questions his dad about the things being said at school, and Bill admits that he molested the boys, that he enjoyed it, and that he would do it again. When Billy asks if he would ever molest him, his father tearfully replies, "No... I jerk off, instead." Trish packs her family into the car the next morning, leaving for her parents' condo in Florida, leaving the audience to presume Bill is going to prison.

Helen Jordan, the middle sister, is a successful author who is adored and envied by everyone she knows, and can have any man she wants. However, her charmed life leaves her ultimately unfulfilled, she despairs that no one wants her for herself, and that the praise regularly heaped upon her is undeserved. She is fascinated by an unknown man who makes obscene phone calls to her apartment and tries to seek out a relationship with him. She is disappointed, though, when she finds out the man is her neighbor Allen, to whom she is not attracted. Allen, who is coincidentally one of Bill's patients, sinks into depression as Helen's rejection ruins his fantasies, but he begins a relationship with Kristina, who lives in the same apartment block down the hall. While on a date, Kristina tells him that she killed the apartment doorman after he raped her. Although Allen is still content with her friendship after she confided this in him, Helen reveals that the genitals of the doorman were discovered by police less than six months later in Kristina's freezer.

Joy, the youngest sister, is overly sensitive and lacking direction. She works in telephone sales, but leaves to do something more fulfilling - teaching at an immigrant-education center. Her students do not like her, and she begins to feel empty in that job, too. Joy is also constantly let down in her personal life. After a rejected suitor, Andy, calls Joy shallow at the beginning of the film and then goes on to kill himself, Helen tries to set her up with other men. Expecting to hear from a suitor, she instead gets an obscene call from Allen. Later, one of her Russian students, Vlad, offers her a ride in his taxi, and they end up having sex. She is initially smitten, but she soon realizes Vlad was using her and that he may be married. After being attacked by someone she thinks is his wife at the school, she goes to his apartment to make amends, but discovers she is not his wife after all, even though they live together and have some sort of relationship. In the apartment she sees her missing guitar and CD player, and insists on getting them back, and he coerces her into lending him $500 in exchange. She is back to being alone.

Finally, the sisters' parents, Mona and Lenny, are separating after 40 years of marriage, but will not get divorced. Lenny is bored with his marriage, but does not want to start another relationship; he simply "wants to be alone." As Mona copes with being single during her twilight years, Lenny tries to rekindle his enthusiasm for life by having an affair with a neighbor. It is no use, however, as Lenny eventually finds that he has become incapable of feeling. The only person who attains happiness is Billy, who finally achieves an orgasm for the first time. He proudly declares this to his family, who respond with confusion.

Cast

 Jane Adams as Joy Jordan
 Elizabeth Ashley as Diane Freed
 Dylan Baker as Bill Maplewood
 Lara Flynn Boyle as Helen Jordan
 Ben Gazzara as Lenny Jordan
 Jared Harris as Vlad
 Philip Seymour Hoffman as Allen
 Louise Lasser as Mona Jordan
 Jon Lovitz as Andrew "Andy" Kornbluth
 Camryn Manheim as Kristina
 Rufus Read as Billy Maplewood
 Cynthia Stevenson as Trish Jordan Maplewood
 Justin Elven as Timmy Maplewood
 Lila Glantzman-Leib as Chloe Maplewood
 Gerry Becker as psychiatrist
 Arthur J. Nascarella as Detective Berman
 Molly Shannon as Nancy
 Marla Maples as Ann Chambeau (real estate agent)
 Ann Harada as Kay
 Douglas McGrath as Tom
 Anne Bobby as Rhonda
 Evan Silverberg as Johnny Grasso

Release

Controversy
The film was highly controversial for its heavy sexual themes, particularly its portrayal of pedophilia. The Sundance Film Festival refused to accept the film, alleging it to be too disagreeable. October Films was the initial distributor for the film, and even helped finance it. However, October Films' owner Seagram refused to release the movie and dropped it from the company. Good Machine ended up releasing the movie on their own, creating a new distribution arm in the process.

Rating

Due to adult themes, Happiness received an NC-17 rating from the MPAA, and that caused the film to be limited in distribution; the film also had difficulty in advertising. For that reason, Happiness surrendered its NC-17 rating and was instead released unrated.

Reception

Critical reception
Roger Ebert gave the film four out of four stars, and rated it number five in his top 10 films of 1998.  In his review, he wrote: "...the depraved are only seeking what we all seek, but with a lack of ordinary moral vision... In a film that looks into the abyss of human despair, there is the horrifying suggestion that these characters may not be grotesque exceptions, but may in fact be part of the mainstream of humanity.... It is not a film for most people. It is certainly for adults only. But it shows Todd Solondz as a filmmaker who deserves attention, who hears the unhappiness in the air and seeks its sources."

In a letter written to playwright Robert Patrick, Quentin Crisp stated, "[Happiness] mistook pleasure for happiness and was quite absurd". In his review in Time Out New York, Andrew Johnston observed, "As repulsive as some of the characters are, Solondz makes most of them deeply sympathetic. And every scene works on several levels at once: The film's most hilarious moments all have poignant undercurrents, while the saddest--and most disturbing--are frequently sidesplitting at the same time."

On review aggregator website Rotten Tomatoes, the film holds an 82% approval rating based on 49 critic reviews, with an average rating of 7.8/10. The site's critical consensus states, "Happiness is far from a cheerful viewing experience, but its grimly humorous script and fearless performances produce a perversely moving search for humanity within everyday depravity." On Metacritic, the film holds a rating of 81 out of 100 based on 30 reviews, indicating "universal acclaim".

Awards
 1998 Cannes Film Festival – FIPRESCI Prize, Parallel Sections
 1999 Golden Globes – Nominated for Best Screenplay (Todd Solondz)
 1998 National Board of Review, USA – Best Acting by an Ensemble
 1999 Independent Spirit Awards – Nominated for Best Director (Todd Solondz), Best Male Lead (Dylan Baker), Best Supporting Male (Philip Seymour Hoffman)
 1998 São Paulo International Film Festival – International Jury Award
 1998 Fort Lauderdale International Film Festival – Critic's Choice Award: Best Actor – Dylan Baker; Best Film
 1998 Toronto International Film Festival – Metro Media Award
 1999 British Independent Film Award – Best Foreign Film, English Language
 1999 Fantasporto – Directors' Week Award – Todd Solondz

Music
Robbie Kondor wrote the film's score. Solondz had originally approached Michael Nyman to work on the soundtrack, but ended up discarding the material Nyman composed.

Eytan Mirsky wrote the title track "Happiness".  Actress Jane Adams sings it in a scene in the film; Michael Stipe and Rain Phoenix sing it over the credits.

The following music is played in the film:
 "Soave sia il vento" from Così fan tutte (Wolfgang Amadeus Mozart)
 "Concerto for Guitar in D Major" (Antonio Vivaldi)
 "Happiness" (Eytan Mirsky) – Jane Adams
 "Requiem" (Wolfgang Amadeus Mozart)
 Piano Concerto (Samuel Barber), movements I and II
 "Mandy" (Richard Kerr and Scott English) – Barry Manilow
 "You Light Up My Life" (Joe Brooks) – Mantovani and Anatoly Aleshin
 "All Out of Love" (Graham Russell and Clive Davis) – Air Supply
 "Eternal Lighthouse", composed and performed by Vladimir Mozenkov, Lyrics by Yevgeny Davidov
 "Happiness" (Eytan Mirsky) – Michael Stipe with Rain Phoenix

References

External links

 
 
 
 

1998 comedy-drama films
1998 films
American comedy-drama films
American black comedy films
American independent films
American satirical films
Films about child sexual abuse
Films about dysfunctional families
Films about pedophilia
Films about sisters
Film controversies
Film controversies in the United States
Obscenity controversies in film
Sexual-related controversies in film
Films set in New Jersey
Films shot in New Jersey
1990s Russian-language films
Films directed by Todd Solondz
Films produced by Christine Vachon
Killer Films films
Trimark Pictures films
1998 independent films
1990s English-language films
1998 multilingual films
American multilingual films
1990s American films